Catholic United Football Club is a football club based in Southend-on-Sea, Essex, England.

History
Prior to Catholic United forming in 1959, Southend Catholic and Catholic Athletic represented the Catholic community in Southend-on-Sea. In 1968, Catholic United adopted green and white hoops after requesting a set of kits from Scottish club Celtic. Ahead of the 2009–10 season, the club joined the Essex Olympian League from the Southend Borough Combination. Between 2014–15 and 2016–17, Catholic United achieved three consecutive promotions in the Essex Olympian League system, winning the Premier Division in their debut season in 2017–18. Catholic United entered the FA Vase for the first time in 2019–20.

Ground
In 2020, after groundsharing with Bowers & Pitsea at the Len Salmon Stadium, Catholic United moved to the Len Forge Centre in Southend-on-Sea.

Honours
Essex Olympian League
Division Three champions 2014–15
Division Two champions 2015–16
Division One runners-up 2016–17
Premier Division champions 2017–18

Anagram Records Trophy
Winners 2017–18, 2018–19

Records
Best FA Vase performance: Second qualifying round, 2019–20

References

External links
Official website

Association football clubs established in 1959
1959 establishments in England
Football clubs in England
Football clubs in Essex
Sports clubs in Southend-on-Sea
Southend Borough Combination
Essex Olympian Football League